Incremental update may refer to:

 Incremental  backup
 Incremental computing